Alcalá del Río is a municipality in Seville, Spain. It had a population of 9,317 in 2005. It has an area of about 83 square kilometers and has a population density of 112.3 people per square kilometer. It has an altitude of 30 meters (about 100 feet) and is situated 13 kilometers away from Seville.

References

Municipalities of the Province of Seville